James Joseph Connolly (September 24, 1881 – December 10, 1952) was a Republican member of the United States House of Representatives for Pennsylvania.

James Connolly was born in Philadelphia, Pennsylvania.  He was a member of the Republican State committee, and served as financial secretary of the Republican city committee of Philadelphia.

He was elected in 1920 as a Republican to the 67th and to the six succeeding Congresses.  He was an unsuccessful candidate for reelection in 1934 and 1936.  After his term in Congress, he was engaged in the real-estate business, and Vice President of Philadelphia Transportation Co. and Transit Investment Corporation.

He died on December 10, 1952 and was interred at Holy Sepulchre Cemetery in Cheltenham Township, Pennsylvania.

References

1881 births
1952 deaths
Burials at Holy Sepulchre Cemetery
Politicians from Philadelphia
Businesspeople from Pennsylvania
Republican Party members of the United States House of Representatives from Pennsylvania
20th-century American politicians
20th-century American businesspeople